Wang Wei (born July 7, 1988) is a Chinese sailor. He and Xu Zangjun placed 18th in the men's 470 event at the 2016 Summer Olympics.

References

1988 births
Living people
Chinese male sailors (sport)
Olympic sailors of China
Sailors at the 2016 Summer Olympics – 470